Conradin Cathomen (born June 2, 1959 in Laax) is a former Swiss alpine skier. He won the silver medal at the FIS Alpine World Ski Championships 1982. He also competed in the men's downhill at the 1984 Winter Olympics.

World Cup victories

References

1959 births
Swiss male alpine skiers
Living people
Olympic alpine skiers of Switzerland
Alpine skiers at the 1984 Winter Olympics